Srinal de Mel is a Sri Lankan politician and a Member of Parliament belonging to the United National Party. He was appointed  to Parliament as a national list member in 2015.

References

Members of the 15th Parliament of Sri Lanka
United National Party politicians
Sinhalese politicians
1941 births
Living people